Philippine Scariest Challenge is a reality based horror/suspense program on TV5 hosted by Jomari Yllana and Cheska Litton that will tackle paranormal situation.

History
The show originally premiered on August 15, 2008, as part of TV5's new line-up of shows after its launching on the August 9 of the same year. It took the 6pm time slot of Friday, before Batang-X: The Next Generation.

Overview
There are three celebrity contestants equipped with a camera and two-way radio as they enter a haunted place. The aim of each contender is to complete the tasks as fast as possible. The tasks usually follows a story that demystified the cause of the paranormal situation on that area (although that there are some fictitious element on it). The contestants can call for help in case of emergency through radio; however they are only allowed up to three calls. If it exceeds three then they will no longer receive any response for help on it. The one that accomplishes the tasks in a faster time wins on that contest. Some of the contestants and even the crew members witness some bizarre scenarios including a ghost that was caught on cam.

TV5 (Philippine TV network) original programming
Philippine reality television series
2008 Philippine television series debuts
2009 Philippine television series endings
Filipino-language television shows